Herbert Louis McMath, Sr.  (September 6, 1954 – October 5, 2016) was a former American football defensive tackle and defensive end in the National Football League (NFL) for the Oakland Raiders and the Green Bay Packers. He played 22 games in two seasons in the NFL and was a part of the Raiders 1976 Super Bowl Champion team.

References

1954 births
2016 deaths
Morningside Mustangs football players
Oakland Raiders players
Green Bay Packers players
People from Coahoma, Mississippi
Players of American football from Mississippi